Viktor Prokopenya (born July 21, 1983) is a European technology entrepreneur and venture investor. Having founded Viaden Media in 2001 and subsequently selling the business in 2011, he launched his investment company, VP Capital, which currently owns several technology businesses including a fintech company Capital.com and Currency.com, a cryptocurrency exchange.

Education 
Viktor Prokopenya was born into a family of scientists: his mother was a mathematician and his father held a doctorate in physical and mathematical sciences, working at the Belarusian State University and later at the Belarusian National Technical University. Viktor studied at schools No. 2 and No. 130, where he graduated with distinction. He received a bachelor's degree in information technology from the European Humanities University (2004), a degree in software development from the Belarusian State University of Informatics and Radioelectronics (2006), and a bachelor's degree in law from the Belarusian State University (2010). He also graduated from the Minsk IPM Business School, gaining a master's degree in business administration (2010), before continuing his higher education in the US at Full Sail University (gaining a master's degree in internet marketing; 2012), Stanford Graduate School of Business (executive MBA course in strategic marketing; 2016) and Northeastern University in Boston (master's degree in finance; 2016). In 2017 he completed his doctorate in business administration at the SBS Swiss Business School.

Entrepreneurship

Viaden Media 

Later in his life, Viktor's father left scientific career and became a businessman. He died in a car crash when Prokopenya was 16, since that time Viktor took on the responsibility of caring for his family. Since the 2000s, Prokopenya earned his living by IT consulting, he founded an IT company Viaden Media. In 2006, he reoriented Viaden to develop IT products.

In 2009, Viaden Media launched a new department, developing mobile applications for iPhone and iPad. The company created more than 100 top-rated applications, including All-in Fitness, Smart Alarm Clock, and Yoga.com. For a long time, All-in Fitness ranked top in the AppStore's Healthcare&Fitness category in more than 40 countries. By 2011, Viaden had achieved more than 200 million mobile application installations and had become the largest mobile phone software developer in Eastern Europe. Prokopenya ran the company until 2011 when he sold it to the founder of software company Playtech. According to the media publications, Viaden Media was purchased for about €95 mln although the exact sum remains undisclosed. Later, Viaden Media was divided into two companies: Sport.com, a fitness applications developer, and Skywind Group, which specialised in mobile and social games.

VP Capital 

In 2012, Prokopenya founded an investment company, VP Capital, which specializes in the technology sector. One of its first investments was into the fintech company, exp(capital), which developed solutions for banks and brokers by constructing algorithms for high-frequency market making. Exp(capital) was ranked the best employer of the year in 2014. Exp(capital)'s mobile applications department was later acquired by British company, IG Holdings, for an undisclosed amount.

In 2012, Prokopenya established VP Capital Real Estate which focused on central street assets. By 2017, the company had become the Minsk's largest private owner of real estate of this kind.

In the summer of 2017, VP Capital announced plans to acquire Paritetbank. At the same time, the company applied for acquisition of the Ukrainian division of Sberbank. However, on August 3, 2017, Prokopenya withdrew the applications. He commented that he has always desired to own a bank and that it would be a venture that he would pursue given the right circumstances.

In December 2016, Larnabel Ventures Fund and VP Capital announced a joint intention to invest in startups in computer vision, augmented reality, and artificial intelligence. From 2017 to 2019, the partners announced six investment agreements on a parity basis, in which they invested equally: Astro Digital, Banuba, Dronefence, FaceMetrics (later merged with Banuba), Capital.com and Currency.com. VP Capital acquired all Larnabel's shares in Capital.com and Currency.com in 2021. Meanwhile, VP Capital's share in Astra Digital and Dronefense was transferred to Larnabel. Larnabel's share in Banuba and its subdivisions was sold to private investors, Prokopenya sold his stake to the company's management. After the split, VP Capital and Larnabel no longer held any joint projects.

Prokopenya's current major projects are Capital.com and Currency.com. Capital.com is an international fintech company that implements AI in financial instruments online-trading. The company was launched in 2016 and created the infrastructure for the cryptocurrency exchange Currency.com. Currency.com became the first regulated tokenised securities exchange on CIS territory. Currency.com is authorised by the GFSC (Gibraltar Financial Services Commission), FinCEN (United States), and FINTRAC (Canada). By second quarter of 2022, Capital.com had 6.4 million accounts.

Legal and social initiatives

Decree on the Development of a Digital Economy 

Prokopenya took part in the development of legislation for the use of autonomous cars, cryptocurrencies and other changes, aimed to stimulate the IT industry in Belarus. These activities started in 2017 and later formed into the Decree on Development of Digital Economy. In the media, Prokopenya was mentioned as the initiator and the architect of the document.

In March 2019 he was granted the Westernization Award for contribution to the development of the legislation in the IT area in Belarus, which became one of the most beneficial legal frameworks for IT businesses in post-Soviet countries. The ceremony took place in the UK Parliament.

Education reform initiatives 

The businessman promoted the digitalization of schools. In December 2018 VP Capital presented 600 students with tablets with preloaded textbooks in Russian and Belarusian. In April 2019 Prokopenya offered to reform the state education system with the following initiatives: to implement electronic paperwork, virtual video tutorials, a personalized teaching method, and in-depth career guidance. He also advocated for increased focus on English in Belarusian schools as part of wider curriculum innovation and for the modernization of the teacher remuneration framework. Prokopenya also supports Belarusian language development. He sponsors «Вяселка» (‘Vyaselka’) magazine for children, Jerzy Giedroyc Literary Award, and «Наша Гiсторыя» (‘Our History’) publication.

In his interviews, Prokopenya drew attention to the limited number of specialists within the new IT economy and the low level of IT education among university graduates: "One of the latest initiatives of our community is to send $15 million to IT education from the High Tech Park fund. Every year we can teach thousands of students." However, the initiatives were not supported by the authorities.

Media relations 
Prokopenya has repeatedly spoken out publicly in defense of independent media and against state pressure on media sites. In January 2018, he opposed the blocking of Charter 97 and Belarusian Partisan sites. Prokopenya said that baseless blocking sites would complicate international relations and damage the image of Belarus. In August 2018, the businessman asked the power structures of Belarus to release the detained journalists and editors of TUT.BY, BelaPAN and other Belarusian media. He said that detaining journalists was ‘a huge step backwards’.

In the spring of 2015, Viktor Prokopenya was detained by Belarusian state authorities. He was suspected of earning profits of $650,000 through unregistered business activity. He refuted all allegations. The IT business community and media came to the defense of Prokopenya. UK Ambassador Bruce Bucknell called the case a ‘disastrous sign to the state economics’. In late 2015, Prokopenya was released on bail. In February 2016, all allegations against him were closed for lack of wrongdoing. After his detention was over, Prokopenya moved to London.

The story of the investigation, detainment, and release gained widespread press coverage in Belarus. At the end of 2017, Prokopenya's legal advisors approached several Belarusian media channels including BelaPAN, BelTA, European Radio for Belarus, Narodnaja Volya, Nasha Niva, Onliner.by, and TUT.BY, requesting to remove or edit old publications that, in their opinion, contained incorrect information. Many of the contacted media made the required corrections. That fact was widely discussed in the context of journalistic ethics. According to European Radio for Belarus, some people, affiliated with Prokopenya, made inquiries about content adjustments to different media resources even in Summer 2021.

In 2017 Prokopenya's VP Capital invested $500,000 into Dev.by media. In 2020 chief editor of Dev.by Natalya Provalinskaya was detained by the Belarusian government. Under pressure from the authorities, the rest of the team was forced to leave the country, they moved to Ukraine and launched Dev.ua. In September 2021, Prokopenya invested additional $500,000 in a joint project with Dev.media (manager of Dev.ua and Dev.by). On June 23, 2022, the director of Dev.by, Vitaly Andros, along with his wife and chief accountant, Elena Andros, were detained in Belarus. Pro-government Telegram channels circulated footage of the couple confessing to their participation in the nation’s 2020 protests and to having subscribed to allegedly ‘extremists’ channels. Three days subsequently, a criminal case against Vitaly Andros was announced. Despite a lack of transparency into original sources, pro-governmental voices accuse him of incitement a coup d'état as well as and Dev.by of provoking negative sentiment against the state.

Charity 
On the outbreak of the COVID-19 pandemic, Viktor Prokopenya criticized the state authorities for ignoring the disease across the country and reluctance to institute quarantine measures. Currency.com launched ‘Help the doctors’ initiative. The company transferred $100,000 to fight coronavirus and introduced the tool to donate cryptocurrencies to help fighting the novel coronavirus.

Prokopenya condemned the violence and repressions of the authorities after the scandalous 2020 Belarusian presidential election. He donated $100,000 to rehabilitate victims of the brutal suppression of the protests and urged the business community to join this initiative. With 300 other CEO's of IT companies, Prokopenya threatened to move his business out of the country if the authorities refused to hold a re-election and continue the violence. When the massive repressions began in Belarus, VP Capital gave its employees an opportunity to leave the country and transfer to offices abroad.

At the onset of the 2022 Ukrainian war, Prokopenya publicly condemned the aggression. In response, Currency.com was the first crypto exchange world-wide to stop working with clients from Russia. In a matter of minutes after this announcement, Currency.com servers endured a violent DDoS attack. According to Prokopenya, the attack was on an unprecedented scale compared to incidents in the past. In early March 2022 the company donated $1 mln to provide relief to Ukrainians affected by the Invasion. The support was distributed across four charity organizations – ASAP Rescue NGO, GlobalGiving, the Relief Fund of the Ministry of Social Policy, and the Ukrainian Red Cross. Later that month, Prokopenya signed an international VC and startup petition that condemned the bloodshed in Ukraine. In February 2023, he attended the Munich Security Conference.

Recognition 
Belarusian media outlet "Ezhednevnik" has included Prokopenya into its list of the 25 most prominent businessmen in the history of independent Belarus. In 2018 he was awarded the "Man of Action" prize in "Creation of exemplary innovative enterprise". Viktor Prokopenya has been named Belarus's Entrepreneur of the Year three times.

Personal life 
Prokopenya is married and has three sons. He resides and works in London, he holds British citizenship His hobbies include diving, cycling, and reading.

Publications

References

External links
Viktor Prokopenya Instagram

1983 births
Living people
Businesspeople from Minsk
Belarusian expatriates in the United Kingdom